The Florida Institute of Technology (Florida Tech or FIT) is a private research university in Melbourne, Florida. The university comprises four academic colleges: Engineering & Science, Aeronautics, Psychology & Liberal Arts, and Business. Approximately half of FIT's students are enrolled in the College of Engineering & Science. The university's 130-acre primary residential campus is near the Melbourne Orlando International Airport and the Florida Tech Research Park.

The university was founded in 1958 as Brevard Engineering College to provide advanced education for professionals working in the space program at what is now the Kennedy Space Center. Florida Tech has been known by its present name since 1966. In 2021, Florida Tech had an on-campus student body of 5,693 between its Melbourne Campus, Melbourne Sites, and Education Centers, as well as 3,623 students enrolled in their online programs, almost equally divided between graduate and undergraduate students with the majority focusing their studies on engineering and the sciences. Florida Tech is classified among "R2: Doctoral Universities – High research activity".

History

Florida Institute of Technology was founded in 1958 as Brevard Engineering College to support NASA by Dr. Jerome P. Keuper, who became the first president. The first concept for the school was developed under the name Brevard Engineering Institute. Classes were originally held at the Melbourne Municipal Airport in buildings formerly used by the Naval Air Station Melbourne. In 1961, the university moved to its current location in Melbourne, Florida. During the 1960s additional classroom and laboratory buildings, a library (formally dedicated on 23 January 1965), the Denius Student Center, Hedgecock Gymnasium, Gleason Auditorium and several dormitories were constructed. In 1961, the first graduate received an associate degree. The university was accredited by the Southern Association of Colleges and Schools in 1964 and officially changed its name to Florida Institute of Technology in 1966. Also in 1966, Dr. Jack Morelock founded the Department of Oceanography. In 1967, the School of Aeronautics was created. Defense scientists and NASA would meet with students recruiting for the space program. In 1969, the Panther Battalion Army ROTC program was formed. In 1970, the college merged with Aerospace Technical Institute to form the School of Aeronautics.

In 1972, the university launched its first off-campus program at the request of the United States Navy.

The Evans Library was completed in early 1984. The following year the original library was renovated and dedicated as the Jerome P. Keuper Administration Building. In 1988, the Homer R. Denius Student Center was renovated, the student plaza completed, and the applied research laboratory building acquired. The Claude Pepper Institute for Aging and Therapeutic Research and Skurla Hall, home of the School of Aeronautics, opened in 1990. In 1997, the university received a $50 million grant from the F. W. Olin Foundation. An engineering building and life sciences building were opened in 1999 in result of the grant.

Seven new residence halls were completed in 2003. Each resident hall was named after one of the seven fallen astronauts of the Shuttle Columbia disaster and dedicated to their memory. In 2004, Florida Tech obtained National Science Foundation (NSF) funding to build a 24-inch telescope atop the newly completed F.W. Olin Physical Sciences Center. However, Melbourne Beach resident Jim Ortega, who had retired from the University of Virginia to Florida in 1998, stepped forward with the additional funds needed to secure a 32-inch telescope. In gratitude to this donation, the telescope was named the Ortega Telescope. In 2005, the F.W. Olin Physical Sciences Center opened.

Construction on the Emil Buehler Center for Aviation Training and Research at Melbourne International Airport began in 2008. The following year, the College of Business became the Nathan M. Bisk College of Business, and the Ruth Funk Center for Textile Arts, the Emil Buehler Center for Aviation Training and Research at the Melbourne International Airport, the Scott Center for Autism Treatment, the Harris Center for Science and Engineering and the Harris Institute for Information Assurance were opened.

In 2009, the college began offering online degrees. November 20, 2015, marked the unveiling of the Harris Student Design Center, an 11,500 square foot building on the south side of campus. This facility provides space for students completing design projects. In 2016, the Center for Advanced Manufacturing and Innovative Design (CAMID) and the Larsen Motorsports High Performance Vehicles & Research Development Center opened at the Research and Development Center on Palm Bay Road.

The university established its football program in 2010. The Panther Aquatic Center was opened a year later. In 2011, the university partnered with the Brevard Art Museum and established it as the Foosaner Art Museum.

In October 2020, the university broke ground at the Olin Quad for the new Health Sciences Research Center, a 61,000 square foot three story facility with 22,300 square feet for classrooms, training and labs.

College archives
The Harry P. Weber University Archives opened in 2014. It was named after professor emeritus Harry Weber, who first joined the college in 1966 and was instrumental in establishing the archives. The archive collection serves to preserve the history of the institution and it is located in the Evans Library.

Jensen Beach Campus
Florida Institute of Technology's Jensen Beach Campus, also known as School of Marine and Environmental Technology or (SOMET), was a specialized branch campus located on the former campus of Saint Joseph College of Florida on the Indian River Lagoon in Jensen Beach, Florida, approximately 50 miles south of the university's main campus. The campus attracted oceanography, underwater technology and other assorted marine biology students. The National Oceanic and Atmospheric Administration had more officers that are graduates of FIT in Jensen Beach than from any other campus or college in the country. The SOMET was transferred to the main campus and became the Department of Marine and Environmental Sciences (DMES). The campus closed after the transition in 1986. In 2016, DMES was renamed Department of Ocean Engineering and Sciences (DOES) to communicate the department's focus.

Campus

The university's 130-acre main campus is located in Melbourne, Florida, on what is known as the Space Coast region along the Atlantic Ocean. The university offers many student services including tutoring, health services, health insurance, and campus safety. Florida Tech has six residence halls and three apartment style accommodations for on-campus living.

Off-campus sites
Florida Tech offers specialized graduate degree programs through sites in Huntsville, Alabama, Fort Eustis, Virginia, Fort Lee, Virginia, Alexandria, Virginia, Quantico, Virginia,  Dover, New Jersey, Naval Air Engineering Station Lakehurst, Lexington Park, Maryland, Aberdeen Proving Ground, Kennedy Space Center, Rockledge, Florida, Melbourne, Florida and Orlando, Florida.

Academics

Student demographics
In fall 2021, Florida Tech enrolled 4,453 students at the main campus; 1,240 at off-campus locations; and 3,623 online for a total of 9,316 students. The male to female ratio in the student body was 69:31. 82% of all students came from the United States, 38% of students were from Florida and 16% of all students came from other countries. In 2020, the average combined Critical Reading and Math SAT score of incoming freshmen at the undergraduate level of Florida Tech was 1232.

Colleges and academic divisions
The university offers degrees in a variety of science and engineering disciplines and is one of the few universities to offer aviation degrees. The university is divided into four academic units: College of Aeronautics, College of Engineering and Science, Nathan Bisk College of Business, College of Psychology and Liberal Arts.

Accreditation
Florida Institute of Technology is accredited by the Commission on Colleges of the Southern Association of Colleges and Schools (SACS). The Engineering programs are also accredited by the Engineering Accreditation Commission of the Accreditation Board for Engineering and Technology (ABET). The Computer Science program is accredited by the Computer Science Accreditation Commission of the Computing Sciences Accreditation Board. Florida Tech's chemistry program is accredited by the Committee on Professional Training of the American Chemical Society. Aeronautical Science and Aviation Management programs are accredited by the Council on Aviation Accreditation. The Clinical Psychology PsyD program is accredited by the American Psychological Association and the graduate Behavior Analysis programs by the Association for Behavior Analysis International (ABAI).

Rankings

Times Higher Education ranks Florida Tech as one of the top 1,000 universities in the world and 245th in the U.S. FIT is also listed as a top 800 world university in the Shanghai rankings. U.S. News & World Report ranks Florida Tech 202nd among national universities in the U.S.

PayScale ranks Florida Tech 123rd in the U.S. based on return on investment (ROI). In 2012, Bloomberg rated Florida Tech as the best Florida college in ROI, using their own methodology and data from PayScale. The Brookings Institution ranked Florida Tech first in Florida and 94th nationally for alumni earnings in 2015, also using data from PayScale. CollegeNET and PayScale ranked Florida Tech 902nd out of 1,363 colleges for enabling social mobility in 2017.

In 2018, Niche ranked FIT 190th out of 1,647 colleges in America after surveying students and recent alumni about their experiences on and off campus. The university received A's in the areas of academics, value, professors, diversity, campus food, and student life.

Barron's ranks Florida Tech a "best buy" in college education. Florida Tech is also listed as a top technical institution in the Fiske Guide to Colleges. Florida Tech was named by Times Higher Education as one of the top universities in the United States for graduate employability in 2016.

Research
Florida Tech is classified as a Doctoral University: Higher Research Activity. In 2018, Florida Tech was awarded $17.4 million in external research funding. From 2009 to 2012, the number of Florida Tech faculty who serve as principal investigators increased by 100% including four recipients of the National Science Foundation (NSF) Career Awards. During this time period, five new interdisciplinary research institutes were initiated that are the focal point for Florida Tech undergraduate and graduate research. These new research university institutes include:
Indian River Lagoon Research Institute
Human-Centered Design Institute
Institute for Energy Systems
Institute for Marine Research
Institute for Materials Science & Nanotechnology
Institute for Research on Global Climate Change

Other research facilities include:
Harris Institute for Assured Information
Institute for Computing and Information Systems
Center for Advanced Coatings (formerly the National Center for Hydrogen Research)
Plasma Spray Thermal Laboratory
High Heat Flux Laser Test Laboratory
Material Science Analysis Laboratory
Institute for Biological and Biomedical Sciences
National Center for Small Business Information

In the college of engineering, some of the research laboratories and research groups include:
Robotics and Spatial Systems
Laser, Optics, and Instrumentation Laboratory
Wind and Hurricane Impact Research Laboratory
Wireless Center of Excellence
Information Characterization and Exploitation Laboratory
BioComplex Laboratory
Computer Vision Group
Laboratory for Learning Research
Software Evolution Laboratory
Center for Software Testing Research

Faculty and students in the Physics/Space Science department conduct research in Astronomy and Astrophysics, Planetary Sciences, High Energy Physics (experimental particle physics), Lightning, Solid State and Condensed Matter Physics, and Space and Magnetospheric Physics.

The Florida Academy of Sciences is headquartered at Florida Tech. The academy is the Florida affiliate of the American Association for the Advancement of Science. The academy also sponsors the Florida Junior Academy of Science and publishes the Florida Scientist journal.

On April 23, 2019, Florida Tech was elected to the Universities Space Research Association.

Evans Library
The Evans Library at Florida Tech was opened in 1984. Prior to the opening of the Evans Library, the university had a library in what is now the Keuper building. One of the features of the Evans Library is its Applied Computing Center (ACC). The ACC has 70 computers for student use which have high speed internet connection and access to software programs including word-processing, statistical analysis, programming, and presentation development software. The Special Collections Department at the Evans Library is home to the Radiation, Inc. Archives which houses documents such as manuals, photographs, correspondence, physical objects, and other memorabilia from Radiation, Inc. Radiation Inc., which later became Harris Corporation and then L3Harris Technologies, was an advanced radio communications company located in Melbourne, FL which had a large impact on the city as well as on Florida Tech. Radiation Inc.'s cofounder Homer Denius helped to finance Florida Tech in its early years while cofounder George Shaw served as the first chairman of Florida Tech's board of trustees. The Denius Student Center and Shaw Hall at Florida Tech are named in their honor. The Evans Library Special Collections Department collaborated with retired Radiation, Inc. employees in collecting materials for the Radiation, Inc. Archives.

Athletics

Florida Tech's athletic teams are known as the Panthers. The school fields teams in 18 sports, 9 each for men and women, at the NCAA Division II level and is a member of the Sunshine State Conference. The sports include: baseball, men's and women's basketball, men's and women's crew, men's and women's cross country, men's and women's golf, men's lacrosse, men's and women's soccer, softball, men's and women's swimming & diving, men's and women's tennis, and women's volleyball. The men's and women's swimming & diving teams were added in fall 2011 and men's lacrosse in Spring 2012. In 2015, Florida Tech Track joined the Peach Belt Conference as associate members.

The university had a football program from 2013 to 2019. The football team played in the NCAA Division II Gulf South Conference as an affiliate member. It won its first game, its first homecoming game, and its first bowl game. In May 2020, Florida Tech shut down its football program due to budget cuts that followed the COVID-19 pandemic.

Boston Red Sox pitcher Tim Wakefield attended Florida Tech and set the home run record in 1987 as a first baseman. His number (3) was retired in 2006.

Florida Tech teams and individuals have won several national championships. The men's soccer team won the NCAA Division II National Championship in 1988 and 1991. Daniela Iacobelli won the National NCAA Division II Woman's Golf Championship in 2007. Florida Tech's Men's swimming 200-yard freestyle relay team won their event in the NCAA Division II National Swim Championship in 2017.

Student life

On-campus housing
Florida Institute of Technology has six traditional residence halls, an eight-building Southgate Apartments complex, a seven-building Columbia Village set of suites and a three-building Harris Village set of suites.

Off-campus housing
Florida Tech runs apartment-style housing options located near campus at Mary Star of the Sea - Newman Hall and Panther Bay Apartments.

Student organizations

Florida Institute of Technology has 132 active student organizations on campus. The university-sponsored student organizations, such as Student Government Association, Campus Activities Board, the Homecoming Committee, FITV (CCTV Channel 99 on campus), and The Crimson (student-run university newspaper) operate in primary university funding. Some organizations are run by membership dues, such as the many fraternities and sororities on campus, as well as certain professional organizations like American Society of Civil Engineers (ASCE), IEEE and AIAA. Other organizations are operated via Student Activities Funding Committee funding, overseen by the Student Government Association Treasurer. Organizations like Residence Hall Association, ACM, Anime Club, and others are operated by SAFC funding. Arts, media, and performance organizations include: Amateur Radio Club, Belletrist, College Players, Dance Association, Film Society, FITV, Florida Tech Pep Band, The Crimson and WFIT.

Students at Florida Tech have the opportunity to participate in a number of club and intramural sports in addition to the varsity athletics programs. The university offers intramural sports Flag Football, Ultimate Frisbee, martial arts, paintball, Disc Golf and Judo. Sport clubs include ice hockey, soccer, table tennis, Collegiate wrestling and baseball. The Florida Tech ice hockey program is a member of the American Collegiate Hockey Association, playing at that organization's Division 3 level.

Greek life
Florida Tech has a number of Greek life opportunities for students. The university's fraternities include Alpha Tau Omega, Lambda Chi Alpha, Chi Phi, Delta Tau Delta, Lambda Chi Alpha, Pi Kappa Alpha, Pi Lambda Phi, Sigma Tau Gamma and Tau Kappa Epsilon. Its sororities include Alpha Phi, Gamma Phi Beta and Phi Sigma Sigma. Florida Tech also has a chapter of Alpha Phi Omega co-ed service fraternity. Squamish, a co-ed fraternal organization, also exists on campus, although it is not Greek life affiliated.

Honor societies
The university offers a number of national and international Honor Societies including the Beta Beta Beta Biological Honor Society, Chi Epsilon a Civil Engineering Students honor society, Delta Mu Delta business honor society, Phi Eta Sigma National Honor Society for freshman class academic achievement, Phi Kappa Phi general academic honor society, Psi Chi honor society of psychology, Tau Beta Pi national engineering honor society and Upsilon Pi Epsilon computing and information systems honor society.

Publications
The university publishes the Florida Tech Crimson, a student published newspaper. The Crimson won a Society of Professional Journalists Regional Mark of Excellence Award in 2014 for best in-depth reporting at a small school (fewer than 9,999 students). In 2016, the College of Aeronautics launched an on-line publication, the International Journal of Aviation Sciences. The university also publishes the Florida Tech Magazine.

Notable people

Presidents
In the Summer of 2022, Robert L. King assumed role as interim president. Previous presidents include:

 T. Dwayne McCay, 2016-2022
 Anthony J. Catanese, 2002–2016
 Lynn E. Weaver, 1987–2002
 John E. Miller, 1986–1987
 Jerome P. Keuper, 1958–1986

See also
 Independent Colleges and Universities of Florida

References

Further reading 
 "Countdown to College: Launching Florida Institute of Technology" by Gordon Patterson. Florida Historical Quarterly Volume 77, Issue 2, Fall 1998
 "Space University: Lift-Off of Florida Institute of Technology". Florida Historical Quarterly Volume 79, Issue 1, Summer 2000.

External links

Florida Tech athletics website

 
1958 establishments in Florida
Aviation schools in Florida
Buildings and structures in Melbourne, Florida
Education in Brevard County, Florida
Educational institutions established in 1958
Engineering universities and colleges in Florida
Melbourne, Florida
Private universities and colleges in Florida
Technological universities in the United States
Universities and colleges accredited by the Southern Association of Colleges and Schools